Bell  Mountain, at  above sea level, is the second highest peak in the Lemhi Range of Idaho. The peak is located on the border of Caribou-Targhee National Forest and Salmon-Challis National Forest. It is the 37th highest peak in Idaho.

References 

Mountains of Lemhi County, Idaho
Mountains of Idaho
Caribou-Targhee National Forest
Salmon-Challis National Forest